The Packard 1A-2500 is an American V-12 liquid-cooled aircraft engine designed by Packard in 1924 as a successor to the World War I-era Liberty L-12. Five aero variants were produced, of which the 3A-2500 was the most numerous.  Three marine versions, used most prominently in American World War II PT-boats, the 3M-2500, 4M-2500, and 5M-2500, were also derived from it.

Applications
Boeing TB
Heinkel HE 8
Martin T3M
Naval Aircraft Factory PN
Huff-Daland LB-1
PT boats - marine versions of the 3M/4M/5M-2500
Packard-Bentley one-off race car
USSR World War II torpedo boats and sub-chasers, which were fitted with 535 4M-2500 engines with W-8 modification under Lend-Lease

Variants
1A-25001924, 800 hp. Six built.
2A-2500'1925, 800 hp. 75 built.
2A-2540? Huff-Daland XHB-1
3A-25001926, Geared propeller drive option, 800 hp. 175 built.
4A-25001927, fitted with a supercharger, 900 hp. One built.
5A-25001930, experimental use only, 1500 hp. One built.
3M-2500Marine version
4M-2500Marine version, 1200 hp (895 kW), subsequently upgraded in stages to 1500 hp (1,150 kW).
5M-2500Marine version, larger supercharger, aftercooler, and power output of 1850 hp

Engines on display
 A Packard 3A-2500 is on display at the National Museum of the United States Air Force.
 A Packard 3A-2500 is in storage at the National Air and Space Museum.
 A Packard 3A-2500 is on display at the New England Air Museum.
 A Packard 4M-2500 is on display at the Packard Proving Grounds Historical Site in Shelby Twp., Michigan.
 A Packard Series 142 Diesel Model 1D-1700 is on display at the Packard Proving Grounds Historical Site in Shelby Twp., Michigan.
 Three working Packard 5M-2500s are installed the only operational PT boat, Higgins PT-658 in Portland, Oregon.

Specifications (1A-2500)

See also

References

Notes

Bibliography

 Gunston, Bill. World Encyclopedia of Aero Engines. Cambridge, England. Patrick Stephens Limited, 1989. 
Aircraft Engine Historical Society - Packard Engines
 Matthews, Birch. Race With the Wind''. Osceola, WI. MBI Publishing, 2001.

External links

Packard 3A-2500 – National Museum of the United States Air Force

1920s aircraft piston engines
1A-2500